Bashu nationalism, also known as the Basuria independence movement, refers to the movement advocating for the creation of a nation state for the Bashu people, a cultural identity in Southwest China. Liu Zhongjing, who invented the term "Basuria", calls for the rejection of Han Chinese culture and the de-Sinicization of his homeland. He has advocated for the secession of Basuria and other states from China.

Terminology 
The term Basuria is a neologism coined by Liu Zhongjing, who wants an independent political entity for the Bashu people to separate from China and become a country of its own. Basuria is an attempt to resurrect the Tribal Confederation of Ba and the Kingdom of Shu, both of which were conquered by the State of Qin in 316 BCE.

Independence movement 

In 2011 author and political critic Liao Yiwu expressed his wish for an independent Sichuan, stating that he will return to his homeland if Sichuan is separated. 
In 2016 writer and activist Yu Jie also expressed his wish for an independent Sichuan. In 2018, inside of Los Angeles, Yu Jie gave a speech promoting Sichuan independence which impressed upon some of the free-thinking younger generation Chinese people who attended the speech.

From 2007 onwards Liu Zhongjing started publishing and posting under the name "数卷残编" and started to gain followers. Liu believes that the best course for Bashu people is to seek independence from China.As of 2018, he seemingly relocated to the United States.
On July 21, 2021, Liu Zhongjing was interviewed by Radio Free Asia about Basuria independence, as the Acting President (臨時大總統) of the Republic of Basuria.

At the end of June 2020, China passed the Hong Kong National Security Law, which has attracted global attention. According to the Hong Kong police's action guidelines for the "National Security Law", examples of behaviors that endanger national security were mentioned, including demonstrators waving designated flags. Examples of flags listed by the police include the "Basuria flag" that appeared in the 2019 New Year's Day parade.

Participants included supporters of independence movements in Hong Kong, East Turkestan, and Bashu, as well as Chinese democracy activists.

During the White Paper Protests against Chinese government in 2022, a protest was held by groups of Chinese dissents in Tokyo in November 17th. There was a person who carried a flags supporting "Basuria", alongside with other flags of separtists such as Tibet and Hong Kong.

References

External links 
 Republic of Basuria- Website of Liu Zhongjing
 Basuria Association- Posts and magazines from the Basuria Association.
 巴蜀同盟會- Articles from the Bashu League.

Independence movements
 
Sichuan
Chongqing
Political controversies
Separatism in China